Khenjan is a village in Baghlan Province in north eastern Afghanistan.

See also 
Baghlan Province

References 

Populated places in Baghlan Province